Shopko (stylized as SHOPKO, formerly stylized as ShopKo) was a chain of department stores based in Green Bay, Wisconsin. All locations closed on June 23, 2019, with the exception of the Shopko Optical locations, which continue to operate.

The company was founded in 1962 by James Ruben as ShopKo Corporation (with upper-case "K").  It opened its first store in 1962 in Green Bay, Wisconsin.

From 1991 to 2005, the company was publicly held, with stock traded on the New York Stock Exchange under the symbol SKO. In December 2005, the company was acquired by an affiliate of Sun Capital Partners and reverted to private ownership.  Starting that year it opened a number of smaller stores named ShopKo Express.  In June 2007, the company changed its  name to Shopko Stores Inc. (with lower-case "k").

In 1999, Shopko purchased Pamida, a regional discount chain that operated mainly in smaller communities of 3,000 to 8,000 people. Shopko operated Pamida as a separate division until 2007, when Pamida was separated from Shopko and reestablished as a separate company. In 2012, Shopko and Pamida merged into one company. Shortly after, most Pamida stores were rebranded as Shopko Hometown.

Shopko filed for Chapter 11 bankruptcy on January 16, 2019. On March 18, 2019, Shopko announced it would close all of its stores by summer 2019. All stores closed on June 23, 2019.

History

1960s
In March 1961, Chicago pharmacist James Ruben and other investors announced the formation of a corporation to open a $1 million department store in Green Bay, Wisconsin, to be called "Shopco".

The store was opened in April 1962 at 216 S. Military Avenue; by that time, the spelling of the name had been changed to "ShopKo", and the company had been registered as "ShopKo Corporation" ShopKo became one of the first chains to offer such services as a pharmacy and eye care center within the store.

In 1966, a second store "ShopKo East" was opened on Main Street, in Green Bay's east side, followed by several other locations in the state in the following years.

In September 1969, the first ShopKo store in Michigan opened, in Marquette.

1970s
In June 1970, Ruben announced plans for corporate headquarters on Ashland Avenue in Ashwaubenon, Wisconsin. In that same month, ShopKo Corp. was renamed "ShopKo Stores, Inc."

In January 1971, the firm announced plans to merge with SuperValu of Minneapolis.

Also in 1971, the new Ashwaubenon headquarters opened. The merger with SuperValu was completed in April 1971. In August 1971, ShopKo announced plans to start putting pharmacies in its stores.

In September 1972, Ruben left the company to become president of SuperValu, and William Tyrrell succeeded him.

In 1977, ShopKo topped $100 million in sales. Starting in 1978, ShopKo included optical centers in some stores.

1980s
In 1983/1984/1985, ShopKo opens a few new locations in a few converted former Copps Department Stores, including Fond du Lac, Wisconsin and Fort Atkinson, Wisconsin. This was in response to Copps refocusing their efforts on their supermarket business and to make it a prime target for shoplifting.
In 1988, a new corporate headquarters opened in Ashwaubenon by the Bay Park Square Mall. The chain also expanded in to Utah, with stores in Sandy, Murray, Taylorsville, Provo, Ogden, Layton, and West Jordan. The company   hit $1 billion in sales on the strength of 87 stores in 1988.

In February 1989, ShopKo and SuperValu introduce Twin Valu, a hypermarket concept, in Cuyahoga Falls, Ohio, combining  the general merchandise of ShopKo with the grocery selection of Cub Foods.

1990s

In 1990, ShopKo opened its 100th store, including its first venture in California.

In mid-1991, SuperValu announced that ShopKo would become a publicly traded company. The stock debuted at $15 a share. Dale Kramer also took over the reins of the company in 1991.

In late 1991, ShopKo introduced a "Vision 2000" prototype model, which opened in Sheboygan, Wisconsin, Duluth, Minnesota, Dixon, Illinois, Loveland, Colorado, Longmont, Colorado, and Lacey, Washington, and relocated stores in Marshall, Minnesota, and Mitchell, South Dakota. The construction of the Sheboygan store was affected by the collapse of an exterior wall that killed a stonemason, and the store opened with a memorial stone and flagpole overlooking the valley below dedicated in his honor.

In 1996, ShopKo announced plans to merge with Phar-Mor, an Ohio-based chain, but those plans were later called off.

In 1997, Shopko acquired Penn-Daniels Inc. and its eighteen Jacks Discount Stores.

Also in 1997, Phar-Mor split from ShopKo, and ShopKo bought out all of SuperValu's stock in the company. ShopKo was among the first retailers in the nation to halt all tobacco sales permanently in the same year.

In 1998 the company acquired Venture Stores in Kentucky, Iowa, Missouri, Illinois and Kansas.

In 1999, William Podany became President of ShopKo. He led the acquisition of 147 Pamida stores later that year. ShopKo also launched spin-off pharmaceutical company ProVantage on to the stock market. 

Late in 1999, ShopKo opened its first test prototype store in Meridian, Idaho, named "Beyond 2000," referring to ShopKo's Beyond 2000 merchandising strategy, the successor to the Vision 2000 strategy of the early 1990s.

2000s
In March 2000, shares of ShopKo hit a record $3.57, up 70% from the year before. Later that year, the firm announced that it would sell ProVantage to Merck & Co. for about $222 million. In May 2000, ShopKo agreed to buy P.M. Place Stores, a 49-location chain, for $22 million, with plans to convert those locations to Pamidas.

Early in 2001, ShopKo announced the closings of 23 stores and a distribution center, cutting 2,500 jobs and bowing out of Missouri, Indiana, Kansas, and Kentucky.

In April 2002 the company's CEO, William Podany, resigned. Jeffrey Girard became his interim replacement, until Sam Duncan took over in October.

In 2005, ShopKo opened the first few "ShopKo Express" locations, which were smaller, and aimed at competition with Walgreens and CVS Pharmacy. Around that time, the chain exited the state of Colorado (some locations were acquired by JCPenney), and closed its Reno, Nevada locations.

Late in 2005, ShopKo was acquired by Sun Capital Partners.

In May 2006, Michael MacDonald took over as CEO.

In 2007, Pamida spun off from ShopKo.

Also in 2007, ShopKo rebranded, dropping the capital camel case "K" in its name and introducing a new logo., but Shopko Express stores retained the older style  until fall 2008.

In 2008, Shopko Express expanded into urban markets with the opening of a Green Bay, Wisconsin location, but this store was shuttered less than a year after it was opened.

During the late 2000s, ShopKo started to anchor more shopping centers, such as the ones in Suamico, Wisconsin and North Branch, Minnesota.

In April 2009, Michael MacDonald resigned as CEO, to become CEO of DSW, Inc., and was replaced by W. Paul Jones.

In late 2009, Shopko started online shopping service.

2010s
In May 2010, Shopko outsourced its IT services to HCL Technologies, based in Chennai, India.

In the summer of 2010, Shopko opened its first two "Shopko Hometown" stores, which were converted from Pamida locations.

In 2011, Shopko placed even more  emphasis on its Hometown subsidiary, opening nine new locations and closing regular stores to focus on the Hometown stores.

In 2012, a decade after it spun off from Shopko, Pamida merged with Shopko; all Pamida stores were rebranded as Shopko Hometown stores. The total cost for the remodel was estimated at $80 million.

Later in 2012, W. Paul Jones resigned from the company's top post and Mike Bettiga took over as interim CEO.

In 2013, Peter McMahon was named Shopko's new CEO.

In 2015, due to bankruptcy, Shopko acquired 20 ALCO Stores locations with the plan of converting them to Hometown locations. Shopko also changed its slogan to "The Stuff that Counts".

Late in 2016, Shopko closed four stores due to poor sales but also opened one in Ely, Nevada.

In November 2016 Shopko launched its first credit card.

In late 2016 and early 2017 the firm also remodeled its larger stores to include some groceries, with limited frozen and perishable goods (mainly frozen pizza and dairy products).

Chapter 11 and liquidation
On December 4, 2018 Shopko confirmed that they were closing 39 stores. The following day, Bloomberg reported that Sun Capital had failed to find a buyer for Shopko and that the capital partners found a Chapter 11 situation increasingly likely.

Shopko began closing its pharmacies in December 2018 and selling their patient records to local competitors including Walgreens, CVS, Hy-Vee and Kroger.

On January 8, 2019, McKesson Corporation filed a suit against Shopko, seeking $67 million in delinquent payments. Along with the announcement, it was reported that Shopko could file for bankruptcy as early as January 15.

On January 16, 2019, Shopko filed for Chapter 11 bankruptcy in Nebraska court, citing tough market competition and assets of less than $1 billion compared to liabilities of up to $10 billion. Shopko also announced the closure of another 105 of its 363 stores, including its original Military Ave. store in Green Bay.

On February 7, 2019, Shopko confirmed the closure of 251 stores or 70 percent of its locations closing in phases between March 2, 2019 and May 12, 2019. The list included 77 Shopko stores, 165 Hometown Values stores, both the 2 standalone pharmacies, and all 7 Express stores. Shopko will exit the states of California, Colorado, Indiana, Kansas, Kentucky, Nevada, New Mexico, Ohio, Oklahoma, Oregon, Texas, Utah, and Washington.

On March 18, 2019, Shopko announced the closure of all remaining stores, due to a buyer not being found for the chain. Liquidation sales ran through the summer.

On April 22, 2019, Shopko announced to employees that despite the fact that the company signed a contract for severance pay, only certain states would actually be paid.

In April 2019, Monarch Alternative Capital LP purchased Shopko's optical operations for $8.5 million. The optical centers continued to operate inside the otherwise-shuttered store locations until smaller locations could be found.

Several former Shopko locations have been repurposed. The former Shopko Hometowns in St Peter Minnesota and New Prague Minnesota have been converted to Hy-Vees. A former Shopko in Mankato, Minnesota is currently being converted into a mixed-use space intended to house a restaurant, indoor ice rink, and indoor event center.

Organization

Shopko

By the time it went out of business, the company operated 363 stores in 24 states including, but not limited to, California, Iowa, Idaho, Illinois, Indiana, Kansas, Kentucky, Michigan, Minnesota, Missouri, Montana, Nebraska, Nevada, North Dakota, Ohio, Oregon, South Dakota, Utah, Washington, Wisconsin, and Wyoming. Stores were typically placed in small to mid-sized communities. Most Shopko stores were located in strip malls, shopping malls, power centers, or freestanding locations. Shopko, with partnerships from Green Bay, Wisconsin-based Bellin Health and other local hospitals, also operated walk-in clinics inside its stores called FastCare.

Past slogans include "Say hello to a good buy at ShopKo", "ShopKo discounts the price...not the quality.", "We won't be undersold.", "ShopKo: Discover for Yourself", "ShopKo - The Store for You.", "ShopKo - Your Lifestyle, Your Pricestyle.", "Shopko - Neat stuff, neat store." and "My life...my style...my store". Shopko's last slogan was "The Stuff that Counts", which was used from 2015 to 2019. The slogan for Shopko Express pharmacy was "Every day. On your way."

Karen McDiarmid was Shopko's spokesperson in the 1980s and 1990s.

Shopko sponsored the exhibition hall venue portion of the Brown County Veterans Memorial Arena/Resch Center complex, known as Shopko Hall. Unrelated to the bankruptcy in any case, Shopko Hall closed on April 28, 2019 with the BCVMA and was demolished, and was replaced with a new expo hall known as the Resch Expo.

Subsidiaries

Shopko Express
Shopko Express (stylized as ) was a chain of pharmacies owned by Shopko. Shopko Express carried a limited selection of general merchandise, groceries, beer, wine, health and beauty supplies, and over-the-counter medicines. Shopko Express also carried lottery tickets.

Shopko Hometown

In 2012 Shopko acquired Pamida and all former Pamida locations then operated as Shopko Hometown stores. Shopko Hometown stores were aimed at smaller communities ranging from 3,000 to 8,000 in population. They carried about 70% of the merchandise of Shopko's larger stores. The first two stores opened in 2010 in Oconto, Wisconsin and Kewaunee, Wisconsin inside converted Pamida locations. In 2015, 20 locations were acquired from the bankrupt ALCO Stores chain, and were converted into Shopko Hometown stores.

Payless ShoeSource

In 1999, Shopko signed a contract with Payless ShoeSource, leasing the floorspace to the shoe chain within Shopko stores with prominent front signage, replacing the previous contract with J. Baker, Inc. as the retailer in charge of the discount shoe department. The changeover was completed by late June 2000. After filing for bankruptcy for the 2nd time, Payless ShoeSource coincidentally closed their stores at the same time Shopko was going out of business.

Private label brands 
Shopko sold an assortment of private label store brand products, primarily in apparel and general merchandise. Popular brands include Shopko, Willow Bay, Bailey's Point, NorthCrest, Energy Zone, Soft Sensations, Peanut & Ollie and Green Soda.

Acquisitions

Shopko
Copps Department Store (Copps Department Stores were the forerunners to the current superstore concept, carrying groceries and general merchandise. When Copps, the Stevens Point, Wisconsin-based retailer left the general merchandise half of the retail business to focus on selling groceries through their Copps Food Center chain in 1983, many former Copps Department Store locations were converted to ShopKo, as well as other retailers, including ShopKo's discount store rivals Prange Way, Kmart and Woolco, as well as Wisconsin-based home improvement retailer Menards.)
Penn-Daniels/Jack's
Venture (most locations; by the end, only the former Dubuque, Iowa location remained operating at the time of Shopko's closure.)
Shopko Hometown
Pamida
ALCO
P.M. Place/Place's

Distribution 
Distribution and transportation was managed by Spectrum America Supply Chain Solutions, a subsidiary of Metro Supply Chain group created in 2016. Shopko's distribution centers were located in De Pere, Wisconsin, Omaha, Nebraska, Quincy, Illinois and Boise, Idaho.

See also
ALCO Stores
P.M. Place Stores
Phar-Mor
SuperValu
Twin Valu
Venture

References

External links
 Official website (now for Shopko Optical only)

Companies based in Green Bay, Wisconsin
Economy of the Midwestern United States
Economy of the Northwestern United States
Defunct discount stores of the United States
Defunct companies based in Wisconsin
American companies established in 1962
Retail companies established in 1962
Retail companies disestablished in 2019
American companies disestablished in 2019
Private equity portfolio companies
1962 establishments in Wisconsin
2019 disestablishments in Wisconsin
Health care companies based in Wisconsin
Companies that filed for Chapter 11 bankruptcy in 2019
2005 mergers and acquisitions